Palasia is a suburb in Indore, the largest city in the Indian state of Madhya Pradesh.

Services and entertainment
Palasia is known as an education hub. It has many coaching institutes for IIT-JEE, medical and school coaching. The old National Highway 3 known as  AB road separates Old Palasia and New Palasia.

Transportation

Several City Bus routes serve the area. Palasia has an Indore BRT (iBus) station.
Autorickshaws, Metro Taxi, City Van, Tata Magic and  various private taxis such as Uber, Meru Cabs, TaxiForSure, jugnoo auto and OlaCabs, are widely available.

Suburbs of Indore
Neighbourhoods in Indore